PrePass is an intelligent transportation system (ITS) that electronically verifies the safety, credentials, and weight of commercial vehicles as they approach participating state highway weigh stations. Because they comply electronically, commercial carriers enrolled in PrePass are authorized to bypass these facilities rather than pull in for manual inspection.

PrePass is available to motor carriers at nearly 390 facilities in 39 states.

History
In 1991 the Crescent Project began as a collaborative research effort to test technologies to weigh trucks at highway speeds and allow compliant trucks to bypass weigh stations. This would aid productivity and efficiencies for motor carriers and enforcement and compliance agencies. After testing several technologies Radio Frequency Identification Detection (RFID) was chosen. In 1993 the non-profit Heavy-Vehicle Electronic License Plate, Inc. (HELP) was formed by several state transportation directors and trucking company executives and Lockheed Martin was contracted to develop a system. In 1995 PrePass was installed in California. By 1998 PrePass was in use in 35 weigh stations in Arkansas, Arizona, California, Colorado, Mississippi, Montana, Nevada, New Mexico, Texas, and Wyoming. 850 companies had signed on with transponders in 55,000 trucks.

Technology and functionality 

The only equipment required for a truck to participate in PrePass is a vehicle-specific transponder, mounted on the interior windshield with double-sided tape or dual-lock strips. These devices are similar to the transponders used for electronic toll collection. As a PrePass vehicle approaches an equipped facility, an electronic "reader" on a boom over the freeway interrogates the transponder.  Information associated with the transponder is then validated against state-required safety and credentials requirements. Weigh-in-Motion (WIM) technology is also used at many locations to verify the truck’s configuration and ensure its axle and gross vehicle weight are within acceptable limits.

As the truck passes beneath another electronic “reader” nearer the inspection point, the in-cab transponder receives a signal indicating whether the vehicle is authorized to bypass.   If the vehicle’s credentials, safety, and weight data are all in order, a green light advises the driver to bypass the facility.  If the vehicle is required to pull-in for inspection, a red light alerts the driver to stop for processing, just as trucks without PrePass do.

Only motor carriers that provide valid operating credentials and have an acceptable safety history are allowed to participate in PrePass. There is a minimum 5% random pull in rate to ensure compliance and this can be changed by PrePass on notification from a state or federal agency or by a customer seeking to actively participate in more than the minimum pull in rate.

Safety criteria
The safety criteria determining if a truck may receive a signal to bypass a scale is the Inspection Selection System (ISS) that is based on the FMCSA Safety Status Measurement System (SafeStat) scores. These scores are derived  from the Compliance, Safety, and Accountability Program's seven metrics referred to as Behavior Analysis and Safety Improvement Categories (BASICs) compiled by the Motor Carrier Management Information System (MCMIS).

Enrollment qualifications 

To enroll in PrePass, a carrier must submit an application and provide copies of certain standard operating credentials (e.g. Vehicle Registration Cards, IFTA Licence, etc.).  Customers pay for system costs through monthly service fees that allow them an unlimited number of bypasses.  There are no charges for the PrePass transponders, no application or enrollment fees, and no long-term contracts.

Additional services

PrePass Plus 
A service that utilizes a “fusion” transponder to allow vehicles to pay toll fees electronically at E-ZPass facilities, in addition to bypassing PrePass facilities.

PrePass Ag (formerly AgPass) 
Enables participating, qualified carriers to bypass Agricultural Interdiction Facilities throughout the state of Florida.  Provided through a partnership with the Florida Department of Agriculture and Consumer Services (FDACS).

NORPASS 
PrePass has partnered with NORPASS in a cooperative agreement between Washington State Department of Transportation (WSDOT), Oregon Department of Transportation (ODOT) Greenlight system, and HELP Inc., the provider of PrePass services, allowing the PrePass transponders to be used in the NORPASS system. This has added 44 locations to the PrePass system. There is no extra charge but a customer must submit a signed waiver of HELP’s data privacy policy upon registration.

Mobile app
In 2017 PrePass introduced the bring-your-own device (BYOD) electronic logging device (ELD) and mobile weigh station (MOTION) bypass application for Android and iOS formats.

See also 
PrePass Safety Alliance
PrePass

References

External links 
 Official site

Trucking industry in the United States